Amatán Municipality is one of the 122 municipalities of Chiapas, in southern Mexico. 
It covers an area of 109.3 km².

As of 2010, the municipality had a total population of 21,275, up from 18,775 as of 2005.

As of 2010, the town of Amatán had a population of 3,947. Other than the town of Amatán, the municipality had 138 localities, the largest of which (with 2010 populations in parentheses) was: Reforma y Planada (1,156), classified as rural.

References

Municipalities of Chiapas